Dumitru Macri (born 28 April 1931) is a Romanian former football player and manager.

Club career
Dumitru Macri was born on 28 April 1931 in Bucharest, Romania and started to play football in 1947 at junior level at Flacăra Roșie București, afterwards he went to play at senior level at Rapid București, masking his Divizia A debut on 19 March 1950 in a 0–0 against Știința Timișoara. He spent all of his career at Rapid which consisted of 15 seasons in which he was the club's captain between 1952 and 1966, the highlights of this period being the reaching of two Cupa României finals in 1961 and 1962 which were lost in front of Arieșul Turda respectively Steaua București and the winning of the 1957 Cupa Primăverii and the 1963–64 Balkans Cup. In 1961, Macri became the first Romanian footballer to be nominated for the Ballon d'Or. During his stay at Rapid, the club relegated twice to Divizia B, but Macri stayed with the club each time, helping it promote back to the first division. Macri made his last Divizia A appearance on 27 June 1965 in a 2–1 victory against Crișul Oradea, having a total of 221 matches and one goal scored in the competition.

International career
Macri played 8 games for Romania, making his debut under coach Augustin Botescu on 26 October 1958 in a friendly which ended with a 2–1 loss against Hungary. His second game was a 3–0 victory against Turkey at the 1960 European Nations' Cup qualifiers, but his best game played for the national team is considered to be a 1–0 victory in a friendly against Turkey after which a Turkish journalist who saw the game and also was one of the 19 journalists who sent nominations to France Football for the 1961 Ballon d'Or, chose Macri on his list of nominees sent to the magazine. His last game played for the national team took place on 1 November 1962 in a 6–0 loss against Spain at the 1964 European Nations' Cup qualifiers. He also appeared twice for Romania's Olympic team at the 1960 Summer Olympics qualifiers.

Managerial career
Dumitru Macri was manager at CFR Timișoara, Rapid București and Olt Scornicești in Divizia A, also managing the Algerian national team from 1974 until 1975.

Personal life
Macri's family comes from Ampelochori, a small village near Kalabaka, Greece. He left Romania in 1986, moving to France with his son, an architect.

Honours

Club
Rapid București
Divizia B: 1952, 1955
Cupa României runner-up: 1960–61, 1961–62
Balkans Cup: 1963–64
Cupa Primăverii: 1957

Individual
Ballon d'Or: 1961 (35th place)

Notes

References

1931 births
Living people
Romanian footballers
Romania international footballers
FC Rapid București players
Association football defenders
Liga I players
Liga II players
Romanian football managers
FC Rapid București managers
Algeria national football team managers
Romanian expatriate football managers
Romanian emigrants to France
Expatriate football managers in Algeria
Romanian expatriate sportspeople in Algeria